Taranto railway station is the main station serving the city and comune of Taranto, in the region of Apulia, southern Italy.  Opened in 1868, it forms a junction between three main lines, from Bari, Brindisi and Reggio di Calabria, respectively.  It is also a terminus of a secondary line, the Bari–Martina Franca–Taranto railway.

The station is currently managed by Rete Ferroviaria Italiana (RFI).  However, the commercial area of the passenger building is managed by Centostazioni.  The station's main line train services are operated by or on behalf of Trenitalia.  Each of these companies is a subsidiary of Ferrovie dello Stato (FS), Italy's state-owned rail company.

Regional train services on the Bari–Martina Franca–Taranto railway are operated by Ferrovie del Sud Est (FSE).

Location
Taranto railway station is situated at Piazza della Libertà, at the end of Via Duca d'Aosta.  It is a short distance to the north west of the Ponte di Porta Napoli, the bridge over the natural channel between Taranto's Mar Grande and its Mar Piccolo.

The station is linked with the city centre by a combination of the Ponte di Porta Napoli, the Isola del Borgo Antico, and  the Ponte di San Francesco di Paola, or Ponte Girevole, a well known symbol of Taranto.  The latter bridge spans the artificial channel between the Mar Grande and the Mar Piccolo.

History
The station was opened on 15 September 1868, upon the inauguration of the Gioia del Colle–Taranto section of the Bari–Taranto railway.

On 28 February 1869, Taranto was also connected with Metaponto, as the Società per le Strade Ferrate Meridionali (SFM) had initiated the construction of the Jonica railway (Taranto–Reggio di Calabria).  On the same day, a connection between the station and the Port of Taranto was opened, as was the first section of the Battipaglia–Potenza–Metaponto railway that, once completed, would open the then-important rail link to Salerno and Naples.

In 1886, the Società per le Strade Ferrate del Mediterraneo opened the Taranto–Brindisi railway.  When finished, it would secure the faster and safer rail connection between these two major railway stations and port locations.  From that point onwards, Taranto station was shared by two railway administrations, Rete Adriatica and Rete Mediterranea.

Until the late nineteenth century, Taranto was an important railway junction for traffic in foodstuffs and timber from Calabria and Sicily to the Adriatic and the north.  Its importance waned after the opening of the Southern Tyrrhenian railway, which diverted most of this traffic via Salerno and Naples.

The establishment of the Ferrovie del Sud Est (FSE) in 1931 created an additional source of regional traffic, via Martina Franca.

Features

The design of the passenger building is influenced by architectural styles that were in vogue in the mid-nineteenth century.  It therefore consists of a two-storey central structure with a central clock tower, and two wings extending laterally for form one elevation.

The trains stopping at the station range from regional services to InterCity, Eurostar Italia and high speed trains.

Most train services are operated by Trenitalia.  Services on the Bari–Martina Franca–Taranto railway are the exception.  They are operated by Ferrovie del Sud Est (FSE).

High speed services (Frecciabianca) Milan - Parma - Bologna - Ancona - Pescara - Foggia - Bari - Taranto
Intercity services Rome - Naples - Salerno - Taranto
Intercity services Rome - Foggia - Bari - Taranto
Intercity services Bologna - Rimini - Ancona - Pescara - Foggia - Bari - Taranto
Intercity services Reggio di Calabria - Siderno - Crotone - Rossano - Taranto
Night train (Intercity Notte) Milan - Ancona - Pescara - Foggia - Bari - Taranto - Brindisi - Lecce
Regional services (Treno regionale) Naples - Salerno - Potenza - Metaponto - Taranto
Local services (Treno regionale) Bari - Gioia del Colle - Taranto
Local services (Treno regionale) Taranto - Francavilla Fontana - Brindisi
Local services (Treno regionale) Martina Franca - Taranto

Interchange
Local buses link the Piazza della Libertà, outside the station, with the city centre.

See also

History of rail transport in Italy
List of railway stations in Apulia
Rail transport in Italy
Railway stations in Italy

References

External links

This article is based upon a translation of the Italian language version as at January 2011.

Railway Station
Railway stations in Apulia
Railway stations opened in 1868
1868 establishments in Italy
Buildings and structures in the Province of Taranto
Railway stations in Italy opened in the 19th century